The Philippine House Committee on Dangerous Drugs, or House Dangerous Drugs Committee is a standing committee of the Philippine House of Representatives.

Jurisdiction 
As prescribed by House Rules, the committee's jurisdiction includes the following:
 Controlled precursors and essential chemicals
 Illegal or prohibited drugs
 Production, manufacture, use and trafficking of illegal drugs
 Rehabilitation and treatment of drug dependents

Members, 18th Congress

Historical members

18th Congress

Member for the Majority 
 Nestor Fongwan (Benguet–Lone, PDP–Laban)

See also 
 House of Representatives of the Philippines
 List of Philippine House of Representatives committees
 Comprehensive Dangerous Drugs Act of 2002
 Philippine Drug War
 Illegal drug trade in the Philippines
 Philippine Drug Enforcement Agency
 Dangerous Drugs Board

Notes

References

External links 
House of Representatives of the Philippines

Dangerous Drugs